Mycobacterium komossense is a species of the phylum Actinomycetota (Gram-positive bacteria with high guanine and cytosine content, one of the dominant phyla of all bacteria), belonging to the genus Mycobacterium.

Description
Gram-positive, nonmotile, short to moderately long and acid-fast rods.

Colony characteristics
Eugonic, smooth, glistening and yellow-beige pigmented colonies. On Middlebrook 7H10 agar 0.5-2mm in diameter with entire margins.

Physiology
Growth on Löwenstein-Jensen media and Middlebrook 7H10 agar at temperatures between 22 °C-37 °C in less than 7 days.
Optimal growth at 31 °C, no growth at 45 °C.

Differential characteristics
Uniqueness of species supported by antigenic analysis (immunodiffusion) and specific lipid patterns.
A numerical taxonomy comparison showed close relationship to Mycobacterium aichiense.

Pathogenesis
Not known to be pathogenic in animals or humans.
Biosafety level 1

Type strain
First isolated from intact sphagnum vegetation in the Komosse sphagnum bog in southern Sweden and Atlantic coastal area of Norway.
Strain Ko 2 = ATCC 33013 = CIP 105293 = DSM 44078 = HAMBI 2279 = HAMBI 2280 = JCM 12408.

References

Kazda,J., K. Muller. 1979.  Mycobacterium komossense sp. nov. International Journal of Systematic Bacteriology, 29, 361–365.]

External links
Type strain of Mycobacterium komossense at BacDive -  the Bacterial Diversity Metadatabase

Acid-fast bacilli
komossense
Bacteria described in 1979